Eyl is an ancient port town in the northeastern Nugal region of Somalia in the autonomous Puntland region, also serving as the capital of the Eyl District. Eyl, also called Illig, was the capital of the Dervishes from 1905 onwards, until superseded by Taleh, which became Dervish capital in 1909.

History

Daarta Dhowre Sheneeleh
Eyl is the site of many historical artifacts and structures. Along with a rock shelter near the southern town of Buur Heybe, it is the seat of the first professional archaeological excavation in the country.

At the turn of the twentieth century, the city served as a bastion for the Dervish forces of Sayyid Mohammed Abdullah Hassan ("Mad Mullah"), the emir of 
 Diiriye Guure. Several forts or Dhulbahante garesas remain from this period, in addition to colonial edifices built by the Italians. Daarta Dhowre Sheneeleh, a prominent fort from the Darawiish era, is located in the city.

The notion of the building of fortresses or Dhulbahante garesas for Dervish inhabitation was conceived in pre-1902 when the Dervishes built a fort at Halin, subsequently at Eyl also called Illig. According to the British War Office, the castle at Illig was exclusively inhabited by the Dhulbahante clan, and in particular by the Bah Ali Gheri subclan of the Dhulbahante:

Darawiish capital
According to Douglas Jardine, Eyl was the capital of Dervishes for four years, from 1905, until it was changed to Taleh in 1909, was at Eyl, also called Illig:

According to Douglas Jardine, the Dervish fortification or Dhulbahante garesa at Illig or Eyl were exclusively inhabited by the Dhulbahante:

Contemporary
Following the outbreak of the civil war in the early 1990s, foreign boats began to illegally fish in the unpatrolled waters off Eyl's coastline. Piracy subsequently emerged as fishermen banded together to protect their livelihood. However, by 2010, intensive security operations by Puntland's military forces coupled with community-led initiatives managed to force out the pirates from their operating centers in the area as well as adjacent settlements.

In March 2012, the Puntland Maritime Police Force (PMPF) dispatched a unit of officers and support elements to Eyl at the request of the municipal authorities. The move was intended to ensure permanent security in the area and to support the local administration. To this end, PMPF soldiers were slated to establish a Forward Operating Base (FOB) in the town earmarked for counter-piracy activities and to begin construction of a logistics airstrip, and to engage in water-drilling. In December 2014, Puntland President Abdiweli Mohamed Ali laid the foundation stone for a new PMPF base in Eyl, which occupies an area of 300 square meters on land donated by the municipality.

Municipality
Town affairs are managed by the Eyl Municipality. As of March 2022, the city authority was led by Mayor Faysal Khaliif Wacays..

Demographics
Eyl has a population of around 21,700 inhabitants. The broader Eyl District has a total population of around 32,345 residents.

Services
As of 2012, the town has one general hospital serving residents. Plans are underway to expand delivery. In April 2012, community leaders and civil society representatives met with the Italian Ambassador to Somalia, Andrea Mazzella, to discuss strategies for ameliorating local health and education services.

In October 2014, the Puntland government in conjunction with the local Kaalo NGO and UN-HABITAT launched a new regional census to gather basic information in order to facilitate social service planning and development, as well as tax collection in remote areas. According to senior Puntland officials, a similar survey was already carried out in towns near the principal Garowe–Bosaso Highway. The new census initiative is slated to begin in the Eyl District, in addition to the Bayla District and Jariban Districts.

Education
Eyl has a number of academic institutions. According to the Puntland Ministry of Education, there are currently 13 primary schools in the Eyl District. Among these are Qarxis Primary, Horsed, Kabal and Xasbahal. Secondary schools in the area include Eyl Secondary.

Economy

Prior to the start of the civil war, Eyl was one of the chief fishing hubs in Somalia. Tuna, lobster, and other high value marine stock were harvested locally for domestic and international seafood markets. The Puntland authorities have since endeavoured to work with the townspeople to rebuild the industry and normalize trade.

As of 2012, several new development projects are slated to be carried out in the town, with the Italian government pledging support.

In September 2013, Puntland Minister of Fisheries, Mohamed Farah Adan, announced that the Puntland government plans to open two new marine training schools in Eyl and Bandar Siyada (Qaw), another northeastern coastal town. The institutes are intended to buttress the regional fisheries industry and enhance the skill set of the Ministry's personnel and local fishermen.

In March 2015, the Ministry of Labour, Youth and Sports in conjunction with the European Union and World Vision launched the Nugal Empowerment for Better Livelihood Project in the Eyl, Garowe, Dangorayo, Godobjiran and Burtinle districts of Puntland. The three-year initiative is valued at $3 million EUR, and is part of the New Deal Compact for Somalia. It aims to buttress the regional economic sector through business support, training and non-formal education programs, community awareness workshops, and mentoring and networking drives.

Media
Media outlets serving Eyl include the Garowe-based Radio Garowe, the sister outlet to Garowe Online. The broadcaster launched a new local FM station in March, 2012.

Transportation
In 2012, the Puntland Highway Authority (PHA) announced a project to connect Eyl and other littoral towns in Puntland to the main regional highway. The 750 km thoroughfare links major cities in the northern part of Somalia, such as Bosaso, Galkayo and Garowe, with other towns in the south. In May 2014, Puntland Vice President Abdihakim Abdullahi Haji Omar arrived in Eyl to inaugurate a newly completed 27 kilometer paved road between the town and adjacent hamlets.

For air transportation, Eyl is served by the Eyl Airport.

Notable residents
Hirsi Bulhan Farah – Former Minister in the civilian government of the 1960s, a political prisoner. Former interim chairman of the Somali parliament and entrepreneur.
Abdirahman Mohamud Farole – former President of Puntland
Abdulqawi Yusuf – international lawyer and President of the International Court of Justice
Abshir Boyah Pirate leader during Piracy off the coast of Somalia

Notes

References
Eyl, Somalia

Populated places in Nugal, Somalia
Piracy in Somalia
Populated coastal places in Somalia
Port cities in Africa
Pirate dens and locations